Tenacibaculum amylolyticum is a bacterium. It was first isolated from sponge and green algae which were collected on the coast of Japan and Palau. Its type strain is MBIC 4355T (= IFO 16310T).

References

Further reading

Lawrence, John M., ed. Sea Urchins: Biology and Ecology. Vol. 38. Academic Press, 2013.
Pavlidis, Michalis, and Constantinos Mylonas, eds. Sparidae: Biology and aquaculture of gilthead sea bream and other species. Wiley. com, 2011.

External links 
LPSN
WORMS entry
Type strain of Tenacibaculum amylolyticum at BacDive -  the Bacterial Diversity Metadatabase

Flavobacteria
Bacteria described in 2001